Mazhar Khan (22 July 1955 – 16 September 1998) was an Indian film and television actor, producer and director. Khan made his debut with the film Sampark (1979), playing the role of Brindavan, but was better acclaimed for his role as Abdul in Shaan (1980), as a street beggar. He made his debut as a producer with the film Bombay Fantasy (1983), and made his directorial debut with the film Gang (2000), released after Khan's death in 1998.

Career
Mazhar made his debut in the 1979 film Sampark. He came into recognition with the 1980 film Shaan which was directed by Ramesh Sippy and co-starred Amitabh Bachchan and Shashi Kapoor. The song "Naam Abdul Hai Mera" from the film was picturized on Khan and became popular. He went on to appear in over 40 Hindi films playing villain and supporting roles throughout the 1980s and early 1990s. He also appeared in a Hollywood science fiction film titled Terminal Entry (1987) where he played one of the main villains. In 1984 he also acted in the television serial "Bombay Meri Jaan" with Madhuri Dixit but that serial was rejected by Doordarshan because of not having an impressive star cast. He was also noted for his role in the television serial Buniyaad (1987) which reunited him with director Ramesh Sippy. In 1989 he acted in the British mini-series Traffik.

His last film appearance was in the 1992 film Angaar after which he quit acting. He turned to producing and directing the multi-starrer film Gang which started production in 1990 and was delayed for many years. The film was released two years after his death.

Personal life and death
Khan was married to Dilip Kumar's niece Rubaina from whom he had a son. After separation from her he married actress Zeenat Aman with whom he had two sons. Mazhar died of kidney failure on 16 September 1998.

Selected filmography

References

External links

1998 deaths
Hindi-language film directors
Indian male television actors
20th-century Indian film directors
Indian television directors
Hindi film producers
Indian television producers
20th-century Indian male actors
Film producers from Mumbai
Film directors from Mumbai
1955 births